Euclera is a genus of moths in the subfamily Arctiinae. The genus was erected by Gottlieb August Wilhelm Herrich-Schäffer in 1855.

Species
Euclera cassotis (Druce, 1883)
Euclera diversipennis (Walker, 1854)
Euclera meones (Stoll, [1780])
Euclera rubricincta (Burmeister, 1878)
Euclera stretchii (Butler, 1876)

References

Arctiinae